Traffic guards, also known as traffic controllers and flaggers, are trained to set up warning signs and barricades to slow down the speed of traffic in a temporary traffic control zone. When they are on scene they will set up equipment to warn approaching traffic about the incident.

Equipment
Traffic guards use a variety of equipment:
Signal flags.
Signal hand sign; called stop/slow paddles in the United States, these are a sign that has 'stop' on one side and 'slow' or 'go' on the other side.
Traffic vest.
Helmet (or a hard hat); protecting the head from hazards.

Automated traffic controls
In some cases, alternatives to human traffic guards are used for traffic control. Traffic guards may be assisted by Automated flagger assistance devices (AFADs) so that they can stay out of the roadway when directing traffic. Temporary traffic lights or yield signs may also be used as an alternative to human traffic guards.

See also
 Traffic police
 State police
 Security police
 Security guard
 Parking enforcement officer
 Highway patrol
 Crossing guard
 Level crossing
 Road traffic control
 Road traffic safety
 Roadworks
 Traffic barrier
 Traffic cadet

References

Road traffic management
Traffic law
Pedestrian crossings